High Efficiency Video Coding tiers and levels are constraints that define a High Efficiency Video Coding (HEVC) bitstream in terms of maximum bit rate, maximum luma sample rate, maximum luma picture size, minimum compression ratio, maximum number of slices allowed, and maximum number of tiles allowed. Lower tiers are more constrained than higher tiers and lower levels are more constrained than higher levels.

Tiers
The HEVC standard defines two tiers: Main and High. The Main tier is a lower tier than the High tier. The tiers were made to deal with applications that differ in terms of their maximum bit rate. The Main tier was designed for most applications while the High tier was designed for very demanding applications.

Levels
The HEVC standard defines thirteen levels. A level is a set of constraints for a bitstream. For levels below level 4 only the Main tier is allowed.  A decoder that conforms to a given tier/level is required to be capable of decoding all bitstreams that are encoded for that tier/level and for all lower tiers/levels.

 The maximum bit rate of the profile is based on the combination of bit depth, chroma sampling, and the type of profile. For bit depth the maximum bit rate increases by 1.5x for 12-bit profiles and 2x for 16-bit profiles. For chroma sampling the maximum bit rate increases by 1.5x for 4:2:2 profiles and 2x for 4:4:4 profiles. For the Intra profiles the maximum bit rate increases by 2x.
 The maximum frame rate supported by HEVC is 300 frames per second (fps).
 The MaxDpbSize, maximum number of pictures in the decoded picture buffer, for the maximum luma picture size of that level is 6 for all levels. The MaxDpbSize can increase to a maximum of 16 frames, if the luma picture size of the video is smaller than the maximum luma picture size of that level, in incremental steps of 4/3×, 2×, or 4×.
 The MinCR, minimum compression ratio, for that level. The MinCR constraint is reduced to half its base value for the 4:2:2 and 4:4:4 chroma sampling profiles and is reduced by an additional half for the Intra profiles. The MinCR is reduced to 1/24th of its base value with the High Throughput 4:4:4 16 Intra profile.
 The maximum number of slice segments is the number of slices allowed per picture at both the maximum resolution and maximum frame rate.
 The maximum number of tiles allowed per picture. The maximum number of tiles allowed per second is the maximum number of tiles allowed per picture times 120.

See also
High Efficiency Video Coding
UHDTV - Digital video formats with resolutions of 4K (3840×2160) and 8K (7680×4320)
Rec. 2020 - ITU-R Recommendation for UHDTV
H.264/MPEG-4 AVC - The predecessor video standard of HEVC
VC-1 - A video standard developed by Microsoft

References

External links
 Fraunhofer Heinrich Hertz Institute HEVC website
 Joint Collaborative Team on Video Coding (JCT-VC)
 JCT-VC Document Management System

Computer file formats
Graphics file formats
High-definition television
Lossy compression algorithms
Open standards covered by patents
Ultra-high-definition television
Video compression
Video codecs
Videotelephony
ITU-T recommendations
ITU-T H Series Recommendations
H.26x
ISO standards
MPEG-H
IEC standards